The following is the current leaderboard for career stolen bases in KBO League Korean baseball.

The first KBO Stolen Base King was Kim Il-kwon, who stole 363 bases in a career that spanned from 1982 to 1991. His record was broken in 1997 by Lee Sun-cheol, who held the record for four years at 371 career steals, until Jeon Jun-ho surpassed him in 2001.

Players with 250 or more stolen bases

 Stats updated as of October 12, 2022.

See also
 List of KBO career hits leaders
 List of KBO career batting average leaders
 List of KBO career home run leaders
 List of KBO career RBI leaders
 List of Major League Baseball career stolen bases leaders

References

Korean baseball articles
KBO career stolen bases leaders